Štrba is a village in the Poprad District, Prešov Region, northern Slovakia. It is situated in the Sub-Tatra Basin, which separates the High Tatras and Low Tatras at the European continental divide between the Baltic and the Black Sea.

Etymology
Slovak , —a narrow place (a gap, a cleft, etc.). The name is probably related to an old trade route between Liptov and Spiš. The Hungarian (1321 Csorba/Chorba) and the German name (1431 Tschirban) come from the Slovak.

History
Historical records first mention Štrba in 1280 as a medieval village of The Kingdom of Hungary. The village owns the lands around the mountain glacial lake, and now resort, of Štrbské pleso, to which it gave its name. Locals had started to profit from the construction of High Tatras facilities at the end of 19th century.

Geography
The municipality lies at an altitude of 829 metres and covers an area of 43.463 km². It has a population of 3,653 people. Its detached borough of Tatranská Štrba hosts the Štrba railway station, the valley terminus of the Štrbské Pleso–Štrba rack railway, and a stop on one of Slovakia's major railways. The mountain resort settlement of Štrbské Pleso also belongs to the village.

References

External links
 Municipal website

Villages and municipalities in Poprad District